The 1999–00 season was PAOK Football Club’s 74th in existence and the club’s 41st consecutive season in the top flight of Greek football. The team will enter the Greek Football Cup in the First round and will also enter in UEFA Cup starting from the First round.

Players

Squad

Transfers

Players transferred in

Players transferred out

Kit

Friendlies

Competitions

Overview

Managerial statistics

Alpha Ethniki

League table

Results summary

Results by round

Matches

1-9:  Arie Haan
10-13:  Stavros Sarafis (Interim)
14-34:  Dusan Bajevic

Greek Cup

First round

Group 2

Matches

Second round

UEFA Cup

First round

Second round

Statistics

Squad statistics

! colspan="13" style="background:#DCDCDC; text-align:center" | Goalkeepers
|-

! colspan="13" style="background:#DCDCDC; text-align:center" | Defenders
|-

	

! colspan="13" style="background:#DCDCDC; text-align:center" | Midfielders
|-

	

! colspan="13" style="background:#DCDCDC; text-align:center" | Forwards
|-

|}

Source: Match reports in competitive matches, uefa.com, epo.gr,  rsssf.com

Goalscorers

Source: Match reports in competitive matches, uefa.com, epo.gr,  rsssf.com

References

External links
 PAOK FC official website

PAOK FC seasons
PAOK